The 2012–13 Long Island Blackbirds men's basketball team represented The Brooklyn Campus of Long Island University during the 2012–13 NCAA Division I men's basketball season. The Blackbirds, led by first year head coach Jack Perri, played their home games at the Athletic, Recreation & Wellness Center, with three home games at the brand new Barclays Center, and were members of the Northeast Conference. They finished the season 20–14, 12–6 in NEC play to finish in a three way tie for second place. They were champions of the NEC tournament for the third consecutive year to earn an automatic bid to the NCAA tournament where they lost in the First Four round to James Madison.

Roster

Schedule

|-
!colspan=9| Regular season

|-
!colspan=9| 2013 Northeast Conference men's basketball tournament

|-
!colspan=9| 2013 NCAA tournament

References

LIU Brooklyn Blackbirds men's basketball seasons
Long Island
Long Island
Long Island Blackbirds men's basketball
Long Island Blackbirds men's basketball